Grenfell Campus, formerly Sir Wilfred Grenfell College, is a campus of the Memorial University of Newfoundland (MUN). It is located in the city of Corner Brook, Newfoundland and Labrador, Canada. The campus has approximately 1,300 students enrolled in degree programs for the arts, education, fine arts, science, resource management and nursing.  Many students from around the province also attend the school for the first- and second-year course offerings before transferring to Memorial University's larger campus in St. John's.

History

The campus opened in 1975 as Memorial University's West Coast Regional College with Arthur Sullivan as its principal. It began with 400 students. The facility was renamed in 1979 in honour of British medical missionary pioneer Wilfred Grenfell. The original building is now known as the Arts and Science Building. In 1988, the campus' second building opened - the Fine Arts Building.

Grenfell Campus saw significant expansion in the 1990s and early 2000s with new student housing and academic buildings constructed. In 1995, the Library and Computing Building opened which housed the newly named Ferriss Hodgett Library; and in 1997, the Student Centre annex was added to the Arts and Science Building. In 1998, the Forest Centre opened, which houses not only laboratory and classroom space, but also research offices for Natural Resources Canada, among others. In 2001, Grenfell opened its chalet apartments; the campus was then able to accommodate more than 400 students in student housing. In 2014, the new Residence Complex was officially opened, increasing student housing capacity to 600 students.

Grenfell Campus played a critical role in helping Corner Brook host the 1999 Canada Winter Games with its residences being used to house athletes. The city's "Canada Games Centre" civic centre opened in 1997, adjacent to the Grenfell campus. Previously run by Memorial University through Western Sports and Entertainment, today, it is known as the "Corner Brook Civic Centre," and is now run by Corner Brook City Council.  On April 1, 2005, the college introduced a wireless local area network in areas of the campus which underwent major upgrades again in 2012.

In Newfoundland and Labrador's 2007 provincial budget, it was announced that Sir Wilfred Grenfell College would become an autonomous university within a single university system. In late 2009, the Government of Newfoundland and Labrador announced that Sir Wilfred Grenfell College would be undergoing several changes, including its own budget and a name change for the campus to include the 'Memorial University brand' and remove the 'College' appellation. However, the announcement fell short of offering the campus true status as a university (within the Memorial system), much to the anger and disappointment of many local residents.

On September 10, 2010, Sir Wilfred Grenfell College was renamed "Grenfell Campus, Memorial University of Newfoundland". The campus has since undergone a major facelift with the expansion of the Arts and Science building which includes additional science laboratories, a herbarium, digital media labs, and an astronomical observatory. On June 11, 2012, the campus unveiled its new logo to the public, which was rolled out in addition to a new marketing campaign entitled "Find Your Corner."  New soil science laboratories, the Boreal Ecosystem Research facility, attached to the Forest Centre, also opened in Summer 2013. In 2016, Western Health closed the nursing school residence in the wake of the 2016 provincial budget. Monaghan Hall, located at Western Regional Memorial Hospital, had 69 rooms and closed that September.

Grenfell Campus introduced a decanal academic structure in 2016, replacing the previous college-style Department Head structure.

In 2016, Prime Minister Justin Trudeau visited Grenfell Campus and planted a Forget-Me-Not at the Danger Tree site memorial.

Degree programs
Memorial University, with the inclusion of the Grenfell Campus, is the only university in Newfoundland and Labrador. Grenfell Campus offers 18 undergraduate degree programs: Bachelor of Arts (English, Historical Studies, Humanities, Psychology, and Social/Cultural Studies), Bachelor of Business Administration, Bachelor of Education (Primary/Elementary Fast Track in Co-operation with St. John’s Campus), Bachelor of Environment and Sustainability (Environmental Studies and Resource Management), Bachelor of Fine Arts (Theatre (Acting and Stage Craft) & Visual Arts), Bachelor of Nursing (Accelerated and Collaborative), Bachelor of Science (Computational Mathematics, Environmental Science (Biology and Chemistry), General Science, Physics, and Psychology).

In addition to the undergraduate programming, Grenfell Campus also offers three Graduate programs: Master of Arts (Environmental Policy), Master of Fine Arts (Visual Arts), and Master of Science (Boreal Ecosystems and Agricultural Sciences). In 2012, Grenfell Campus established its first graduate program with its Master of Arts in Environmental Policy.  In 2015, the campus introduced the Master of Science in boreal ecosystems and agricultural sciences.
Beyond the degree offerings, the campus also offers courses in a variety of other fields.

Facility and features
Grenfell Campus consists of five main academic buildings the Arts and Science Building, Fine Arts Building, Library and Computing Building, Forest Centre, and Monaghan Hall located off-campus at the site of Western Memorial Regional Hospital home to the Faculty of Nursing. The original campus building, known as the Arts and Science Building, also contains the Student Centre Annex which hosts the students’ union offices, the campus dining hall The Grove, and the campus pub, The Backlot.

Observatory
The Arts and Science building extension contains the campus Observatory, the only professional telescope in Newfoundland and Labrador. The observatory regularly opens itself to the public for presentations and observation nights, frequently presented by Svetlana Barkanova. The facility also assists with the campus Physics program and research.

Residence
The campus also has on-campus accommodations for approximately 600 students spread across three residential areas. Residence Wings (Bennett and Pittman), two Chalet Sites (Site 1: Tuckamore, Spruce, Juniper, Jack Pine, Birch. Site 2: Gros Morne, Topsail, and Torngat), and the Residence Complex.

Aging Research Centre
The Aging Research Centre (ARC) is primarily located at Grenfell Campus, but also has spaces in St. John's, Grand Falls-Windsor, and North-West River. The office at Grenfell Campus provides space and equipment to conduct research, conduct interviews, and meet. The centre was created in response to the province not having such a facility and its rapidly ageing population, among the highest in Canada.

Boreal Ecosystem Research Facility
The Boreal Ecosystem Research Facility is located within the Forest Centre at Grenfell Campus. The Facility was established to promote "university and private sector research priorities in forestry, agriculture and the environmental sector". The facility also supports research activity for its Master of Science program

Environmental Policy Institute
The Environmental Policy Institute (EPI) was established at Grenfell Campus in tandem with its Master of Arts in Environmental Policy. The Centre engages in research, teaching, and public engagement

See also
 Sir Wilfred Thomason Grenfell
 Al Pittman
 List of astronomical observatories in Canada

References

External links
 Grenfell Campus Main Page
 Grenfell Campus Student Union
 GCSU Backlot

Memorial University of Newfoundland
Corner Brook
Educational institutions established in 1975
1975 establishments in Newfoundland and Labrador
Astronomical observatories in Canada